The list of symphonies in F-sharp minor includes:

George Frederick Bristow
Symphony in F-sharp minor, Op. 26
Alexander Glazunov
Symphony No. 2, Op. 16
Joseph Haydn
Symphony No. 45 "Farewell" (1772)
Nicolai Myaskovsky
, Op. 51
Dora Pejačević
Symphony in F-sharp minor, Op. 41
Paul Juon
Symphony in F-sharp minor, Op. 10 (1895)

See also
List of symphonies by key

F sharp minor
Symphonies